33 Ledgelawn Avenue is an historic building in Bar Harbor, Maine, formerly St. Edward's Convent. It is an architecturally distinguished building designed by local architect Milton Stratton and built in 1917 in the Jacobethan style.  The building was listed on the National Register of Historic Places in 1998. It was home to the Bar Harbor Historical Society until early 2019.

Architecture and building history
The building is set on the west side of Ledgelawn Avenue, a residential side street in the main village of Bar Harbor.  It is a 2-1/2 story brick building, three bays wide, with a cross-gable roof configuration caused by a projecting section at the left half of the front facade.  This projection is fronted by a large flat-roof bay two stories in height, with a band of three windows across the front, and single windows on the angled sides.  The first-floor windows have foxed lower sashes topped by diamond-pane transoms, and the second-floor windows have larger diamond panes in a fixed sash, and are set in a stone frame with a Tudor arch.  The main entrance is slightly recessed in the rightmost front bay.  The other windows of the front are smaller, but also feature diamond paned sashes and stone surrounds with Jacobethan styling.

The building was designed by the Bar Harbor architect Milton Stratton, and built in 1917 with funding from Mr. and Mrs. Edward de Veau Morrell of Philadelphia, who owned a summer estate in Bar Harbor.  The building is locally distinctive as the only significant example of Jacobethan architecture.  Louise (Drexel) Morrell was the founders of Drexel University and sister to Saint Katherine Drexel.

The building has eighteen rooms, of which ten are bedrooms. There is one full bathroom and three half-bathrooms. It is 4,909 square feet.

The Bar Harbor Historical Society was headquartered in the building between 1997 and early 2019, when it moved to the La Rochelle mansion on West Street.

See also
National Register of Historic Places listings in Hancock County, Maine

References

Properties of religious function on the National Register of Historic Places in Maine
Churches completed in 1917
Buildings and structures in Bar Harbor, Maine
National Register of Historic Places in Hancock County, Maine